Pollex newguineai is a moth of the family Erebidae first described by Michael Fibiger in 2007. It is known from Western New Guinea in Indonesia.

References

Micronoctuini
Taxa named by Michael Fibiger
Moths described in 2007